The Tilled Field (French: La terre labourée; Catalan: Terra llaurada) is a 1923–1924 oil-on-canvas painting by Catalan painter Joan Miró, depicting a stylised view of his family's farm at Mont-roig del Camp in Catalonia. The painting shows development from Miró's earlier works, such as The Farm, and is considered to be one of his first Surrealist works, created around the same time as the more abstracted Catalan Landscape (The Hunter). It is held by the Solomon R. Guggenheim Museum, in New York.

Analysis
The Tilled Field is dominated by muted tones of yellow and brown. The painting is divided into three areas by two horizontal lines, perhaps representing the sky, sea and earth. A diagonal line seems to put the top right corner of the painting in the dark of night, while the rest is in the light of day. The painting is littered with a confused mixture of forms, many with aspects of humans, animals, and plants. The various animal forms are derived from Catalan ceramics, including a lizard wearing a conical hat.  A tree to the right of centre has a large eye in its green crown and a human ear on its brown trunk.  Hanging from the tree is a shape covered with more eyes, possibly a pinecone, or perhaps a leaf or a spider; at the base of the tree is a folded newspaper with the French word jour (day).  Further right, in the background, is a human figure following a cattle-drawn plough, based on the Altamira cave paintings.  Also in the background, towards the centre, is a ramshackle house with chimney, and further left a tree-like object bearing the flags of France, Spain and Catalonia.  Another plant-like object to the left bears a further flag, possibly French, perhaps symbolising the border between France (left) and Spain (right)

References
 The Tilled Field (La terre labourée), Solomon R. Guggenheim Museum, New York
 Joan Miró: 1893-1983, Janis Mink, Taschen, 2000, pp. 37–39.
 Companion to Spanish Surrealism, Robert Havard, Tamesis Books, 2004, pp. 33–34.

 

1924 paintings
Paintings by Joan Miró
Surrealist paintings
Farming in art
Birds in art
Cattle in art
Lizards in art
Flags in art
Paintings in the collection of the Solomon R. Guggenheim Museum